Mu Lupi (μ Lup) is a system of three or four stars in the southern constellation of Lupus. It is visible to the naked eye with an apparent visual magnitude of 4.29 and lies roughly 340 light-years from the Sun.

Two of the components of this system, A and B, form a pair with an angular separation of 1.1 arcseconds. As of 2014, no orbit has been published. Component C lies at an angular separation of 22.6 arcseconds from the AB pair, and may be a common proper motion companion. It is an A-type main-sequence star with a classification of A2 V. A fourth component at an angular separation of 6.15 arcseconds from component A, may be a brown dwarf.

References

B-type main-sequence stars
Lupus (constellation)
Lupi, Mu
CD-47 09860
135734
74911
5683